Corcyra is a genus of snout moths. It was described by Ragonot in 1885, and is known from China, Great Britain, Australia, and Egypt.

Species
These four species belong to the genus Corcyra, after the species Corcyra brunnea was moved to the genus Procometis.
 Corcyra asthenitis Turner, 1904
 Corcyra cephalonica Stainton, 1866
 Corcyra lineata Legrand, 1965
 Corcyra nidicolella Rebel, 1914

Some researchers have recently determined Corcyra to be a synonym of the genus Aphomia, and treat the above species as members of Aphomia.

See also
 Rice moth
 Aphomia

References

Tirathabini
Taxa named by Émile Louis Ragonot
Pyralidae genera